Priotrochus aniesae is a species of sea snail, a marine gastropod mollusk in the family Trochidae, the top-snails.

Distribution
This marine species occurs in the mud flats on the east coast of Masirah Island, off Oman.

References

External links
 To World Register of Marine Species

aniesae
Gastropods described in 1992